A foam roller is a lightweight, cylindrical tube of compressed foam. It may be used for many reasons, including increasing flexibility, reducing soreness, and eliminating muscle knots. Foam rolling is a method of self-myofascial release. Foam rollers have a short term positive impact in the range of motion of joints, but long term performance or range of motion benefits are unknown. Combining foam rolling and stretching does not cause a significant impact in range of motion compared to only foam rolling or stretching, but does have a superior effect in performance only if stretching is done after foam rolling. A 2021 analysis of studies concluded that "evidence seems to justify the widespread use of foam rolling as a warm-up activity rather than a recovery tool" while arguing that post exercise or recovery rolling reduced muscle pain perception. A 2019 review concluded that 90 seconds of foam rolling per muscle group may be the minimum needed to achieve a reduction in muscle pain or soreness in the short term but that there is insufficient evidence for the optimal amount.

Rollers come in different sizes and degrees of firmness. The firmness (often identified by the color) can range from soft to firm, soft being best for beginners.

References 

Exercise equipment
Massage devices